Pearl Jam Twenty (also known as PJ20) is a 2011 American documentary directed by Cameron Crowe about the band Pearl Jam. Preliminary footage was being shot as of June 2010. Crowe completed filming in April 2011, after using 12,000 hours of footage of the band for the documentary. The film premiered at the 2011 Toronto International Film Festival and also had an accompanying book and soundtrack.

The documentary charts the history of the band, from the demise of Mother Love Bone, their battle against Ticketmaster and the tragedy of the Roskilde Festival in 2000.

The film was presented theatrically at select cinemas in the US during the month of September 2011, and premiered on October 21, 2011, on PBS' American Masters. It was released on DVD and Blu-ray on October 24, 2011. A book, written by Jonathan Cohen, was published concurrent to the film's release.

Cast

 Eddie Vedder
 Stone Gossard
 Jeff Ament
 Mike McCready
 Matt Cameron
 Chris Cornell
 Kurt Cobain
 Neil Young

Soundtrack

The film soundtrack includes live recordings from 1990 through 2010.

Charts

Certifications

References

External links
 

2011 films
2011 documentary films
American documentary films
Rockumentaries
Documentary films about Seattle
Films directed by Cameron Crowe
Films produced by Cameron Crowe
Pearl Jam
American Masters films
Vinyl Films films
2010s English-language films
2010s American films